Mohawk is an unincorporated community in McDowell County, West Virginia, United States. Mohawk had a post office, which opened on December 8, 1903, and closed on June 27, 2009. The community was named after the Mohawk Indians.

References

Unincorporated communities in McDowell County, West Virginia
Unincorporated communities in West Virginia
Coal towns in West Virginia